The 1925 Delaware State Hornets football team represented Delaware State University in the 1925 college football season as an independent. In the school's second season, Delaware State compiled a 0–2 record, with losses against Atlantic City High School and Moorestown High School.

Schedule

References

Delaware State
Delaware State Hornets football seasons
College football winless seasons
Delaware State Hornets football